Bítouchov is a municipality and village in Mladá Boleslav District in the Central Bohemian Region of the Czech Republic. It has about 400 inhabitants.

Administrative parts
Villages of Dalešice and Dolánky are administrative parts of Bítouchov.

Geography
It lies in the Jizera Table.

History
The first written mention of Bítouchov is from 1388. However, mention of "Bítúch's court" allegedly appeared as early as the 12th century. The village was part of the Zvířetice estate.

Sights
In the centre of Bítouchov is the Chapel of the Virgin Mary.

Notable people
Voitre Marek (1919–1999), Czech-Australian artist

Gallery

References

External links

Villages in Mladá Boleslav District